= Hípica =

Coordinates: 30°09′25″S 51°10′45″W

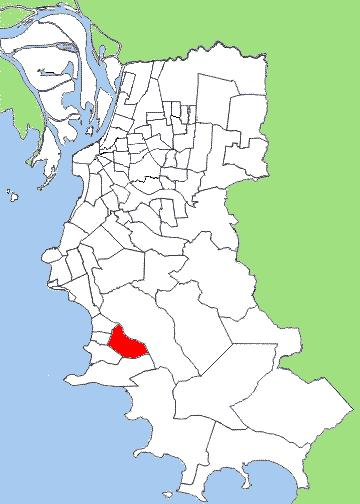

Hípica (meaning Equestrian in English) is a neighbourhood (bairro) in the city of Porto Alegre, the state capital of Rio Grande do Sul, in Brazil. It was created by Law 6893 from September 12, 1991.

Hípica was named after the Sociedade Hípica Porto Alegrense (Porto Alegre Equestrian Society), which is installed here since 1939.
